"The Power" is the fourth single from Australian recording artist Vanessa Amorosi's debut album, The Power. In Australia, the single was released as a double A-side with "Every Time I Close My Eyes" on 11 December 2000. The single became Amorosi's third consecutive top-10 single on the Australian Singles Chart.

Track listing
Australian CD single
 "The Power" (single version) – 3:26
 "Every Time I Close My Eyes" (single version) – 3:45
 "The Power" (album version) – 3:26
 "The Power" (Spiced Mix) – 3:26
 "Absolutely Everybody" (UK club video clip)

Charts

Weekly chart

Year-end charts

Certifications

Release history

References

2000 singles
2000 songs
Songs written by Mark Holden
Songs written by Paul Wiltshire
Songs written by Vanessa Amorosi
Vanessa Amorosi songs